The 1956 United States Senate election in Connecticut was held on November 6, 1956. 

Incumbent Senator Prescott Bush, who won a special election in 1952, was re-elected to a full term in office over Democratic U.S. Representative Thomas J. Dodd. As of 2022, this is the last time that a Republican has been elected to Connecticut's Class 3 Senate seat.

Democratic nomination

Candidates
Thomas J. Dodd, U.S. Representative from Hartford

Convention
Dodd was nominated at the convention on July 7 without opposition.

General election

Candidates
Prescott Bush, incumbent Senator since 1952
Thomas J. Dodd, U.S. Representative from Hartford
Jasper McLevy, Mayor of Bridgeport since 1933 (Socialist)
Suzanne S. Stevenson (Independent Republican)

Results

See also 
 1956 United States Senate elections

References 

1956
Connecticut
United States Senate